Dilworth Park  is a public park and open space along the western side of City Hall in Center City, Philadelphia. The  park opened to the public on September 4, 2014.

History

Dilworth Park opened in September 2014. It is named in honor of Richardson Dilworth, who served as mayor of the city from 1956 to 1962. The current park was designed by KieranTimberlake, Urban Engineers and OLIN and replaced Dilworth Plaza, designed by Vincent Kling in 1972.

Centre Square 
City Hall is located in what was originally named Centre Square. Centre Square was one of the five original public squares planned by William Penn in 1682. Centre Square was the geographic heart of the city until 1854, when Philadelphia expanded its city boundaries with the Act of Consolidation. Centre Square never became the social heart of the city as originally intended, but it remained in use until 1871, when construction of City Hall began.

Penn planned for Centre Square to be:

However, the Delaware riverfront would remain the de facto economic and social heart of the city for more than a century.

Features
Dilworth Park contains:
 grass lawns and landscaping, 
 two large sloped glass stair canopies, 
 a fountain/ice skating rink
 a cafe 
 restaurant

See also

Penn Center
Philadelphia City Hall
Richardson Dilworth
List of parks in Philadelphia

References

External links
Center City District page about Dilworth Park

Municipal parks in Philadelphia
Center City, Philadelphia
2014 establishments in Pennsylvania